A. Harding Steerman (21 November 1863 – 1947) was an English actor. He is sometimes credited as Harding Steerman.

He was born Alfred Harding Treeby Stalman in St Pancras, London and died in Plymouth, Devon.

Selected filmography
 Iron Justice (1915)
 A Bid for Fortune (1917)
 The Elusive Pimpernel (1919)
 The Manchester Man (1920)
 Mr. Gilfil's Love Story (1920)
 Bleak House (1920)
 Beyond the Dreams of Avarice (1920)
 Love at the Wheel (1921)
 The God in the Garden (1921)
The Corner Man (1921)
 The Old Curiosity Shop (1921)
 The Lilac Sunbonnet (1922)
 The Scourge (1922)
 Diana of the Crossways (1922)
 A Romance of Old Baghdad (1922)
 The Three Students (1923)
 Love, Life and Laughter (1923)
 Lights of London (1923)
 Motherland (1927)
 Other People's Sins (1931)

References

External links
 

1863 births
1947 deaths
English male stage actors
English male film actors
English male silent film actors
20th-century English male actors
Male actors from London
20th-century British male actors